{{safesubst:#invoke:RfD|||month = March
|day = 18
|year = 2023
|time = 15:40
|timestamp = 20230318154040

|content=
REDIRECT Spacecraft bus (James Webb Space Telescope)

}}